Sahare may refer to:

Sahare, Bheri, Nepal
Sahare, Janakpur, Nepal